The 2016 Dayton Flyers football team represented the University of Dayton in the 2016 NCAA Division I FCS football season. They were led by ninth-year head coach Rick Chamberlin and played their home games at Welcome Stadium. They were a member of the Pioneer Football League. They finished the season 9–2, 7–1 in PFL play to finish in second place.

Schedule

Source: Schedule

Game summaries

Central State

Robert Morris

@ Duquesne

@ San Diego

Drake

Morehead State

@ Jacksonville

@ Butler

Stetson

Valparaiso

@ Marist

References

Dayton
Dayton Flyers football seasons
Dayton Flyers football